OneSubsea is a Schlumberger company, headquartered in Houston, Texas, United States. The company is a subsea supplier  for the subsea oil and gas market.

OneSubsea has more than 5,000 employees in over 23 countries operating in six divisions—Integrated Solutions, Production Systems, Processing Systems, Control Systems, Swivel and Marine Systems, and Subsea Services—that provide products and services to oil and gas operators around the world including the FRIEND Remote Surveillance & Diagnostic System.

History
The integration of Cameron subsea section and Schlumberger-owned Framo Engineering in 2013 formed Onesubsea as a 60% Cameron and 40% Schlumberger joint venture. This cooperation, finally led to major acquisition of Cameron and OneSubsea in a $14.8 billion deal in late 2015.

Shell Stones
In August 2015, it was announced that OneSubsea was awarded a contract to supply subsea processing systems for the Shell Offshore Inc. Stones development in the Gulf of Mexico. The project was deemed the industry's first 15,000-PSI (super high pressure) subsea pump system with high capacity.

Business alliance
 In January 2015, Helix, OneSubsea and Schlumberger formed the Subsea Services Alliance to develop technologies and deliver equipment and services to optimize the value chain of subsea well intervention systems.
 In July 2015, Subsea7 and OneSubsea jointly announced a global alliance to design, develop and deliver integrated subsea development solutions through the combination of subsurface expertise, subsea production systems, subsea processing systems, subsea umbilicals, risers and flowlines systems (SURF) and life-of-field services. This was considered as a move against rivals FMC and also GE oil and gas that lately formed major alliance with other subsea companies.

See also

 List of oilfield service companies
 Oil industry
 Wellhead

References

Energy engineering and contractor companies
Oilfield services companies
Manufacturing companies based in Houston
Multinational companies headquartered in the United States
Offshore engineering